Atlantihyla is a genus of frogs in the family Hylidae. It is endemic to Central America, specifically to Honduras and Guatemala. The generic name refers to its distribution on the Atlantic side of the isthmus (from Atlantis+hyla). The members of the genus are known as stream frogs.

Taxonomy
The genus was established based on molecular data in a revision of the subfamily Hylinae by Julián Faivovich and colleagues in 2018. In order to obtain a monophyletic Ptychohyla, Faivovich and colleagues moved two former Ptychohyla species to Atlantihyla and four former Ptychohyla species to  Quilticohyla. Atlantihyla has a sister group relationship to a poorly-supported clade that includes Bromeliohyla, Duellmanohyla, and Quilticohyla. A third Atlantihyla species was described in 2020.

Description
The only, tentative phenotypic synapomorphy of this genus is the presence of a well-defined ventrolateral white stripe. A vertical rostral keel is present. Males measure  and females  in snout–vent length. The tadpoles have large oral discs.

Species 
There are currently three recognized species:
 Atlantihyla melissa Townsend, Herrera-B., Hofmann, Luque-Montes, Ross, Dudek, Krygeris, Duchamp, and Wilson, 2020
 Atlantihyla panchoi (Duellman and Campbell, 1982) – Guatemala stream frog
 Atlantihyla spinipollex (K. P. Schmidt, 1936) – Ceiba stream frog

The AmphibiaWeb lists this genus as monotypic, with Atlantihyla melissa as the sole species.

References 

Hylinae
 
Amphibian genera
Amphibians of Central America
Taxa named by Jonathan A. Campbell
Taxa named by Darrel Frost
Taxa named by Gunther Köhler
Taxa named by James Randall McCranie